Yitzhak "Aki" Avni (born ), is an Israeli actor, entertainer and television host. He appeared in the movie Free Zone with Natalie Portman. He also played the character Mohsen in the second season of the television series 24.

Early and personal life
Yitzhak ("Aki") Avni was born and raised in Rehovot, Israel, to Turkish-born Sephardic Jewish parents. While in school he began performing in various shows in his home town. When growing up he had a modeling career. He performed his military service in 1987–1988 in the Israeli Air Force and was discharged with the rank of sergeant. He was married to Israeli model and actress Sendi Bar. They resided for several years in Los Angeles with their child. They separated after returning to Israel in 2008. Avni married Nicole Miller in 2014. They have 2 children, and reisde in Herzliya, Israel.

Entertainment and acting career

Following his military service, he joined an entertainment troupe at a hotel in Eilat, appeared in children's shows and commercials, and trained at Yoram Levinstein's acting studio. His breakthrough arrived when he was elected to be a co-host on Arutz 1's Tossess youth television program.

In 1992 he co-starred in the musical Lelackek T'toot (Licking the Strawberry), alongside Aviv Geffen in Naarei Hachof (The Beach Boys) and played a young homosexual man in Amos Guttman's last film, Chesed Mufla (Amazing Grace). In 1993 he appeared in the film Zarrim Balaila (Strangers in the Night).

In 1994, with the launching of Channel 2, Avni began hosting the dating show Stutz (Fling) and the musical Pachot o Yoter (More or Less, Israeli version of The Price Is Right). In 1995 he hosted the Pre-Eurovision contest with Michaela Bercu, participated in the film Sachkanim (Actors), in the musical Grease, and starred in the play West Side Story alongside Noa Tishby. He has hosted the Miss Israel Pageant and other beauty pageants.

In February 2012, Avni led Israel's Public Diplomacy Ministry's Faces of Israel mission around the English-speaking world. This comprises 100 Israelis including "settlers, Arabs, artists, experts in national security, gay people, and immigrants from Ethiopia [...] [to] represent and defend the state".

In 2019 he appeared alongside Nicole Raidman as her love interest in two music videos.

Filmography
JAG
24
Huff
My Mom's New Boyfriend
Damascus Cover
Time of Favor

References

External links
 

1967 births
Living people
Beauty pageant hosts
Israeli Sephardi Jews
Israeli male film actors
Israeli male television actors
Israeli male models
Israeli television presenters
People from Rehovot
Israeli people of Turkish-Jewish descent
Israeli Mizrahi Jews